The Tyrrell 003 is a Formula One (F1) racing car which was designed by Tyrrell's chief designer, Derek Gardner and used in the  and  F1 seasons. It was driven by Jackie Stewart to the 1971 World Drivers' Championship.

The 003 was effectively the same as the Tyrrell 001 with a redesigned nose section, longer wheelbase, and a narrower monocoque.

Conception
When Ken Tyrrell, the team's owner, became disenchanted with the poor performance of the March chassis during the  season, he decided he would design and build his own car. He employed Derek Gardner to design it in secret at his own house. The project, codenamed "SP", which meant "Special Project", cost Tyrrell over £22,000 of his own money. The resulting car named Tyrrell 001 made its debut at Oulton Park in a non-championship race.

After the season had finished, Gardner redesigned some sections of the car, altering the airbox, remodelling the nose section, lengthening the wheelbase and slightly narrowing the monocoque. The redesigned car became known as the 002 and 003, which were chassis numbers given to each of the cars made for the  season. The team also switched tyre supplier to Goodyear after Dunlop withdrew from F1.

Competition
Driven by Jackie Stewart, it debuted at the 1971 Spanish Grand Prix and won at the first attempt. Tyrrell and Stewart took advantage as Lotus and Ferrari struggled during 1971; they won six races with Stewart claiming his second World Championship. Stewart and team mate François Cevert used different chassis throughout both 1971 and 1972 accommodating their different heights, with the shorter Stewart using 003 and the taller Cevert competing with the Tyrrell 002. New front bodywork debuted on Stewart's 003 for the French Grand Prix, and this bodywork was put on Cevert's 002 for the following Grand Prix in Britain.

The  season saw Lotus back in form with Emerson Fittipaldi challenging Stewart for the championship. The Tyrrell 003 was not a match for the developed Lotus 72 and the Tyrrell team only won when the 72 failed to finish. Fittipaldi won the title that season by a comfortable margin. Despite scoring two wins with Stewart during 1972 (he also won two races with the new 005), the 003 had come to the end of its racing life. Tyrrell 003 remains the Tyrrell team's most successful chassis.

The vehicle is currently on display at the National Museum of Scotland, Edinburgh.

Complete Formula One World Championship results
(key)(results in bold indicate pole position, results in italics indicate fastest lap)

† 54 points were scored using the Tyrrell 003; the other 19 points were scored using the Tyrrell 001 and Tyrrell 002

‡ 24 points were scored using the Tyrrell 003; the other 27 points were scored using the Tyrrell 002, Tyrrell 004 and Tyrrell 005

References

Footnotes

Sources
Formula 1 official website-1971 Tyrrell team statistics
Formula 1 official website-1972 Tyrrell team statistics

Tyrrell Formula One cars
Formula One championship-winning cars